Hyles livornicoides, the Australian striped hawk moth, is a moth of the family Sphingidae first described by Eugen Johann Christoph Esper in 1779. The larvae are known by the common name Yeperenye caterpillar, in the Arrernte language the caterpillars are referred to as Ayepe-arenye.

Distribution 
It is found in Australia in New South Wales, the Northern Territory, Queensland, Victoria and Western Australia.

Description 
The wingspan is about 60 mm.

Biology 
The larvae feed on Portulaca oleracea, Boerhavia diffusa, Boerhavia schomburgkiana, Vitis vinifera and Tribulus terrestris. They are gregarious and live in dense colonies.

Human interactions
H. livornicoides was considered by the Arrernte people to be the most important ancestral being, along with the Ntyarlke and Utnerrengatye caterpillars. The caterpillar in the Arrernte language is known as Ayepe-arenye, referring to the ayepe (tar-vine) that they feed on.

The larvae were used as food by Aborigines. They starved the caterpillars for a day or two before roasting them in hot ashes. Due to their sacred nature, following decapitation, their entrails were removed and buried in a hole. The cooked larvae were said to have a pleasant savoury taste and could be stored for a long time.

References

External links
Australian Faunal Directory

Hyles (moth)
Moths described in 1779